Agyneta silvae is a species of sheet weaver found in Peru. It was described by Millidge in 1991.

References

silvae
Spiders described in 1991
Spiders of South America
Invertebrates of Peru